Mauricio Salles de Alencar (born 1 March 1978) is a Brazilian professional footballer. On 20 January 2010, he was ranked 25th in the USL First Division Top 25 of the Decade, which announced a list of the best and most influential players of the previous decade.

Career

South America
Salles turned professional in 1997, and has played with Brazilian sides Vitória, Atlético Paranaense and Botafogo, as well as in Ecuador for Olmedo.

North America
Salles began his professional career in the United States in 2004 with the Puerto Rico Islanders where he is all time highest goal scorer. He later left for the Montreal Impact in 2006, and then to the Atlanta Silverbacks in January 2007. That same season he moved to Japan with Omiya Ardija, where he scored one goal in eight appearances, before returning to the United States with the Rochester Rhinos in 2008.

In February 2015, the Rochester Lancers named team captain Salles as Team MVP for the 2014–15 season. In March 2015, the Major Arena Soccer League named Salles to the 2014-15 MASL All-League Second Team.

Asia
Salles signed for Kazma in the Kuwaiti Premier League in the summer of 2009.

References

External links

Player profile at Rochester Lancers
Player profile at MASL

1978 births
Living people
Atlanta Silverbacks players
Botafogo de Futebol e Regatas players
Brazilian expatriate footballers
Brazilian expatriate sportspeople in Canada
Brazilian expatriate sportspeople in Japan
Brazilian expatriate sportspeople in Puerto Rico
Brazilian footballers
Club Athletico Paranaense players
Charlotte Eagles players
Esporte Clube Vitória players
Expatriate footballers in Japan
Expatriate footballers in Puerto Rico
Expatriate soccer players in Canada
Expatriate soccer players in the United States
Association football forwards
Montreal Impact (1992–2011) players
Omiya Ardija players
J1 League players
Sportspeople from Salvador, Bahia
Brazilian expatriate sportspeople in Kuwait
Puerto Rico Islanders players
Rochester New York FC players
USL First Division players
Expatriate footballers in Kuwait
USL Championship players
VSI Tampa Bay FC players
Florida Tropics SC players
Major Arena Soccer League players
Utica City FC players
Ontario Fury players
Kazma SC players
Kuwait Premier League players